The National Basketball Association's Coach of the Year is an annual National Basketball Association (NBA) award given since the 1962–63 NBA season. The winner receives the Red Auerbach Trophy, which is named in honor of the head coach who led the Boston Celtics to nine NBA championships from 1956 to 1966. The winner is selected at the end of the regular season by a panel of sportswriters from the United States and Canada, each of whom casts a vote for first, second and third place selections. Each first-place vote is worth five points; each second-place vote is worth three points; and each third-place vote is worth one point. The person with the highest point total, regardless of the number of first-place votes, wins the award.

Since its inception, the award has been given to 40 different coaches. The most recent award winner is current Phoenix Suns head coach Monty Williams. Gregg Popovich, Don Nelson and Pat Riley have each won the award three times, while Hubie Brown, Mike Budenholzer, Mike D'Antoni, Bill Fitch, Cotton Fitzsimmons, Gene Shue, and Tom Thibodeau have each won it twice. No coach has won consecutive Coach of the Year awards. Riley is the only coach to be named Coach of the Year with three franchises. Tom Heinsohn, Bill Sharman, and Lenny Wilkens are the only recipients to have been inducted to the Naismith Memorial Basketball Hall of Fame as both player and coach. Johnny Kerr is the only person to win the award with a losing record (33–48 with the Chicago Bulls in ). Kerr was honored because he had guided the Bulls to the NBA Playoffs in their first season in the league. Doc Rivers is the only person to win the award despite his team not making the playoffs (41–41 with the Orlando Magic in ). Only five recipients also coached the team that won the championship the same season: Red Auerbach, Red Holzman, Bill Sharman, Phil Jackson, and Gregg Popovich. Popovich is the only NBA Coach of the Year recipient to win the championship in the same season twice, winning the NBA title with the San Antonio Spurs in 2003 and 2014. 2020 winner and current Toronto Raptors head coach Nick Nurse is the only coach to receive this honor in both the NBA and the NBA G League, having received the G League award in 2011.

2015–16 recipient Steve Kerr only coached 39 of the 82 games in the season due to complications from offseason back surgery, though he received credit for all of the Golden State Warriors' 73 wins that season. Assistant coach Luke Walton served as interim head coach for the other 43 games for the Warriors, receiving one second-place vote and two third-place votes. Kerr asked the league to award Walton with the wins accumulated during Kerr's medical recovery time, but the NBA refused to do so because under league rules interim head coaches do not have win-loss records at all.

Winners

Multi-time winners

Teams

See also
 
 NBCA Coach of the Year Award, awarded by NBA coaches' union
 NBL (United States) Coach of the Year Award

Notes

References
General

Specific

Coach
National Basketball Association lists
National Basketball Association coaches
Basketball coaching awards in the United States
Awards established in 1963